Hiroki Ueno (上野 拓紀, born April 8, 1986) is a Japanese professional ice hockey winger currently playing for the East Hokkaido Cranes of the Asia League.

Since 2011 he plays for the Nikkō Ice Bucks. He previously played between 2009–2011 for the  Asia League Korean team High1 and, at university level, for the Waseda University. During the 2014–15 season Ueno scored 80 points to lead the Asia League in scoring (while tied with Michael Swift in points, Ueno had more goals and was therefore credited as the scoring leader); this made him only the second Asian player to win the scoring title in the league, after fellow Japanese Go Tanaka in 2010–11. He has played for the Japanese national team since 2006.

References

External links

Ice Bucks's players profile

1986 births
People from Nagano (city)
Japanese ice hockey forwards
Living people
Nippon Paper Cranes players
Asian Games silver medalists for Japan
Asian Games bronze medalists for Japan
Medalists at the 2011 Asian Winter Games
Medalists at the 2017 Asian Winter Games
Ice hockey players at the 2011 Asian Winter Games
Ice hockey players at the 2017 Asian Winter Games
High1 players
Nikkō Ice Bucks players
Asian Games medalists in ice hockey